Scooby-Doo! & Batman: The Brave and the Bold is a 2018 American animated direct-to-video superhero action comedy film produced by Warner Bros. Animation and distributed by Warner Bros. Home Entertainment, and the thirtieth entry in the direct-to-video series of Scooby-Doo films. The film is a crossover between Scooby-Doo and Batman: The Brave and the Bold. The film involves Scooby-Doo and his friends teaming with Batman and other DC Comics superheroes in order to defeat a new villain. It is the first film based on Batman: The Brave and the Bold since the series ended in 2011. Most of the cast from the series reprised their roles (including Diedrich Bader as Batman) although a few roles were re-cast with other actors from different DC projects. The film was premiered at the TCL Chinese Theatre on January 6, 2018 and was released on DVD and digitally on January 9, 2018.

Plot
Mystery Incorporated investigates a series of thefts performed by the ghost of Puppetto the Puppeteer and his puppet. As they try to capture the ghost, Batman intervenes, warning them to leave things to the professionals. Fred manages to capture Puppetto and the puppet, and Mystery Inc. deduces their identities of Martian Manhunter and Detective Chimp. Batman, Manhunter and Detective Chimp reveal that the Puppetto mystery was an initiation test for Mystery Inc. to join the Mystery Analysts of Gotham, which they accept. Unbeknownst to the heroes, they are observed by a red-cloaked figure.

A week later, Batman foils a gold robbery by Riddler, Catwoman and Killer Croc with help from The Question and Aquaman. Aquaman expresses interest in joining the Analysts, but is rejected for not being a detective. Mystery Inc. arrives at the Analysts' headquarters, meeting Question, Black Canary and Plastic Man, as well as a tagalong Aquaman. Mystery Inc. is asked to take the lead in the next case for the Analysts. When an alarm sounds from Gotham Chemical Storage, the assembled Analysts head for the warehouse, finding that several vials of a radioactive isotope have been stolen. The red-cloaked figure appears, declaring himself to be the Crimson Cloak, and swears revenge on Batman and Gotham for making him into a ghost. Crimson Cloak sets the storage on fire, but the Analysts escape the blast with Plastic Man's help.

While the Analysts put out the fire, Batman sends Mystery Inc. to a diner to rejoin them later. Believing it to be connected to the Crimson Cloak, Batman discloses his single unsolved case; during his first year of crime-fighting, he attempted to stop Professor Milo from experimenting with an unstable teleporter, but was unable to stop the vortex from killing one of Milo's assistants, Leo Scarlett. Batman and Mystery Inc. conclude the likely suspects behind the Crimson Cloak to be Sam Scarlett, or Riddler, after Daphne deduces him to be Milo's second assistant under the alias of "Wade Magny".

Following this lead, Batman and Mystery Inc. travel to Arkham Asylum, where Riddler confirms their suspicions and advises them to check Arkham's cemetery. As Batman and Mystery Inc. begin to leave, Crimson Cloak appears and releases the inmates Clock King, Harley Quinn, Killer Croc, Mr. Freeze, Poison Ivy, and Two-Face from their cells, although Batman manages to re-imprison them. At the cemetery, Batman and Mystery Inc. discover the remains of Leo's jacket and a clay footprint. As they return to the Mystery Machine, they are intercepted by Harvey Bullock and the Analysts, who attempt to arrest them for the isotope theft due to fake evidence planted in the van. Batman and Mystery Inc. escape. In No Man's Land, Scooby-Doo and Shaggy throw off Bane and Blockbuster. Upon crashing into a villain bar, they run afoul of Joker and Penguin who transport their fellow Gotham's villains in their respectful vehicles. Batman summons the Batmobile to have Mystery Inc. escape into it.

After escaping the Analysts who beat up the villains, Batman takes the Mystery Inc. to the Batcave. After watching Bullock's press conference about Mystery Inc. leaves them there while he investigates Milo's old laboratory. Aquaman and Question, refusing to believe the false accusations made against Mystery Inc., join Batman and find Milo's teleporter restored by Crimson Cloak. Crimson Cloak attacks them, seemingly killing Question and capturing Batman and Aquaman. Within the Batcave, Velma attempts to analyze the clay footprint only for it to suddenly come to life and attack. After overcoming it using a Bat-Dehydrator, Mystery Inc. deduces the Crimson Cloak's true identity for themselves.

Realizing that Batman has been captured by the Cloak, Mystery Inc. equips themselves with the old costumes and gadgets of Batman and his former sidekicks, and arrive to save Batman. Crimson Cloak shapeshifts into Batman's other enemies to stop them, but Mystery Inc. manages to incapacitate him with the Dehydrator and shut down the teleporter. Mystery Inc. exposes the Cloak as Clayface, who admits to stealing the isotopes and restoring the teleporter in exchange for a cure for the gradual decay of his body as Bullock has Clayface taken to Blackgate Penitentiary. Batman deduces that Riddler was the one who hired Clayface, leaving a clay duplicate of himself in Arkham. He then unmasks Question to reveal Riddler, having realized that he swapped places with the real Question due to one of Aquaman's observations.

Now exposed, Riddler escapes back into the lab, followed by Mystery Inc and the Analysts. He reactivates the teleporter and prepares to use it as a superweapon to destroy Gotham, only to be knocked out by the real Question. The vortex grows out of control, but at the same time, a human shape begins to manifest in it. Working together, Mystery Inc. and the Analysts reverse the device's polarity, allowing Batman and Scooby-Doo to free the figure from the vortex before the teleporter self-destructs. The figure is revealed to be Leo Scarlett, having been trapped in an interdimensional void.

Leo is reunited with his father. Riddler and his henchmen are arrested by the police. Batman thanks Mystery Inc. for their help before taking off into the night.

Voice cast
 Frank Welker as Scooby-Doo, Fred Jones
 Grey Griffin as Daphne Blake, Black Canary
 Matthew Lillard as Shaggy Rogers
 Kate Micucci as Velma Dinkley
 Diedrich Bader as Batman
 John Michael Higgins as Riddler
 Jeffrey Combs as Question
 John DiMaggio as Aquaman, Mr. Freeze
 Nika Futterman as Catwoman
 Nicholas Guest as Martian Manhunter
 Jeff Bennett as Joker
 Tom Kenny as Penguin, Plastic Man
 Kevin Michael Richardson as Clayface, Detective Chimp
 Tara Strong as Harley Quinn, Poison Ivy
 Fred Tatasciore as Harvey Bullock

References

External links
 
 

2010s English-language films
2010s American animated films
2010s animated superhero films
2018 animated films
2018 films
Animated Batman films
Films based on television series
Films produced by Sam Register
American science fiction adventure films
American children's animated mystery films
Warner Bros. Animation animated films
Scooby-Doo direct-to-video animated films
Batman: The Brave and the Bold
2018 direct-to-video films
American children's animated adventure films
American children's animated comic science fiction films
American children's animated superhero films
Animated crossover films
Warner Bros. direct-to-video animated films
2018 action comedy films
2010s children's animated films